The 1852 Connecticut gubernatorial election was held on April 5, 1852. Incumbent governor and Democratic Party nominee Thomas H. Seymour defeated incumbent Lieutenant Governor and Whig nominee Green Kendrick  with 50.39% of the vote.

General election

Candidates
Major party candidates

Thomas H. Seymour, Democratic
Green Kendrick, Whig

Minor party candidates

Francis Gillette, Free Soil

Results

References

1852
Connecticut
Gubernatorial